In mathematics, the Coxeter number h is the order of a Coxeter element of an irreducible Coxeter group. It is named after H.S.M. Coxeter.

Definitions
Note that this article assumes a finite Coxeter group. For infinite Coxeter groups, there are multiple conjugacy classes of Coxeter elements, and they have infinite order.

There are many different ways to define the Coxeter number h of an irreducible root system.

A Coxeter element is a product of all simple reflections. The product depends on the order in which they are taken, but different orderings produce conjugate elements, which have the same order.

The Coxeter number is the order of any Coxeter element;.
The Coxeter number is 2m/n, where n is the rank, and m is the number of reflections. In the crystallographic case, m is half the number of roots; and 2m+n is the dimension of the  corresponding semisimple Lie algebra.
If the highest root is Σmiαi for simple roots αi, then the Coxeter number is 1 + Σmi.
The Coxeter number is the highest degree of a fundamental invariant of the Coxeter group acting on polynomials.

The Coxeter number for each Dynkin type is given in the following table:

The invariants of the Coxeter group acting on polynomials form a polynomial algebra
whose generators are the fundamental invariants; their degrees are given in the table above. 
Notice that if m is a degree of a fundamental invariant then so is h + 2 − m.

The eigenvalues of a Coxeter element are the numbers e2πi(m − 1)/h as m runs through the degrees of the fundamental invariants. Since this starts with m = 2, these include the primitive hth root of unity, ζh = e2πi/h, which is important in the Coxeter plane, below.

The dual Coxeter number is 1 plus the sum of the coefficients of simple roots in the highest short root of the dual root system.

Group order
There are relations between the order g of the Coxeter group and the Coxeter number h:
 [p]: 2h/gp = 1
 [p,q]: 8/gp,q = 2/p + 2/q -1
 [p,q,r]: 64h/gp,q,r = 12 - p - 2q - r + 4/p + 4/r
 [p,q,r,s]: 16/gp,q,r,s = 8/gp,q,r + 8/gq,r,s + 2/(ps) - 1/p - 1/q - 1/r - 1/s +1
 ...

For example, [3,3,5] has h=30, so 64*30/g = 12 - 3 - 6 - 5 + 4/3 + 4/5 = 2/15, so g = 1920*15/2 = 960*15 = 14400.

Coxeter elements

Distinct Coxeter elements correspond to orientations of the Coxeter diagram (i.e. to Dynkin quivers): the simple reflections corresponding to source vertices are written first, downstream vertices later, and sinks last. (The choice of order among non-adjacent vertices is irrelevant, since they correspond to commuting reflections.)  A special choice is the alternating orientation, in which the simple reflections are partitioned into two sets of non-adjacent vertices, and all edges are oriented from the first to the second set. The alternating orientation produces a special Coxeter element w satisfying , where w0 is the longest element, provided the Coxeter number h is even.

For , the symmetric group on n elements, Coxeter elements are certain n-cycles: 
the product of simple reflections  is the Coxeter element . For n even, the alternating orientation Coxeter element is:
 
There are  distinct Coxeter elements among the  n-cycles.

Coxeter plane

For a given Coxeter element w, there is a unique plane P on which w acts by rotation by 2π/h. This is called the Coxeter plane and is the plane on which P has eigenvalues e2πi/h and e−2πi/h = e2πi(h−1)/h.

The Coxeter plane is often used to draw diagrams of higher-dimensional polytopes and root systems – the vertices and edges of the polytope, or roots (and some edges connecting these) are orthogonally projected onto the Coxeter plane, yielding a Petrie polygon with h-fold rotational symmetry. For root systems, no root maps to zero, corresponding to the Coxeter element not fixing any root or rather axis (not having eigenvalue 1 or −1), so the projections of orbits under w form h-fold circular arrangements and there is an empty center, as in the E8 diagram at above right. For polytopes, a vertex may map to zero, as depicted below. Projections onto the Coxeter plane are depicted below for the Platonic solids.

In three dimensions, the symmetry of a regular polyhedron, {p,q}, with one directed Petrie polygon marked, defined as a composite of 3 reflections, has rotoinversion symmetry Sh, [2+,h+], order h. Adding a mirror, the symmetry can be doubled to antiprismatic symmetry, Dhd, [2+,h], order 2h. In orthogonal 2D projection, this becomes dihedral symmetry, Dihh, [h], order 2h.

In four dimensions, the symmetry of a regular polychoron, {p,q,r}, with one directed Petrie polygon marked is a double rotation, defined as a composite of 4 reflections, with symmetry +1/h[Ch×Ch] (John H. Conway), (C2h/C1;C2h/C1) (#1', Patrick du Val (1964)), order h.

In five dimensions, the symmetry of a regular 5-polytope, {p,q,r,s}, with one directed Petrie polygon marked, is represented by the composite of 5 reflections.

In dimensions 6 to 8 there are 3 exceptional Coxeter groups; one uniform polytope from each dimension represents the roots of the exceptional Lie groups En. The Coxeter elements are 12, 18 and 30 respectively.

See also
 Longest element of a Coxeter group

Notes

References

Hiller, Howard Geometry of Coxeter groups. Research Notes in Mathematics, 54. Pitman (Advanced Publishing Program), Boston, Mass.-London, 1982. iv+213 pp. 
 

 

Bernšteĭn, I. N.; Gelʹfand, I. M.; Ponomarev, V. A., "Coxeter functors, and Gabriel's theorem" (Russian), Uspekhi Mat. Nauk 28 (1973), no. 2(170), 19–33. Translation on Bernstein's website.

Lie groups
Coxeter groups